Divin Enfant (Merry Christmess!) is a 2014 French comedy film directed by Olivier Doran and starring Émilie Dequenne, Sami Bouajila and Géraldine Pailhas.

Cast
 Sami Bouajila as Jean  
 Géraldine Pailhas as Pauline 
 Linh Dan Pham as Marie 
 Émilie Dequenne as Sarah  
 Guillaume de Tonquédec as Éric 
 India Hair as Sophie
 Natacha Lindinger as Elisabeth
 Pascal Demolon as Xavier
 Marco Prince as Thomas

See also 
 List of Christmas films
 In Bed with Santa (1999)
 Messy Christmas (2007)

References

External links
 

2014 films
2010s Christmas comedy films
Belgian comedy films
French Christmas comedy films
2010s French-language films
Remakes of Swedish films
Luxembourgian comedy films
2014 comedy films
French-language Belgian films
French-language Luxembourgian films
2010s French films